Maarten Treurniet (born 21 January 1959) is a Dutch film director.

Biography 
Treurniet was born in Amsterdam, the Netherlands. He moved to Dwingeloo in 1959 and went to High school in Assen from 1971 until 1977. After high school he returned to Amsterdam and studied chemistry at the University of Amsterdam from 1978 until 1980. After chemistry he studied electronics at the Higher Technical College (H.T.S.). During his electronics study he started doing the sound effects and other sound technical things for a theater group 'Orkater' and he did production of various CDs and LPs. Finally after his studies he went to the Amsterdam College of Arts faculty Film and Television from 1986 until 1990. During his time in the Amsterdam College of Arts faculty Film and Television he directed a Sunday morning show for VPRO, directed and made the scenario for de Nachtwacht (six minutes) and de Dochter van de Nacht (20 minutes), he helped with the direction of a play called Parking by Olga Zuiderhoek and Loes Luca and he did the screenplay and directed a graduation film Het Nadeel van de Twijfel. In 1990 he earned a degree for directing, editing, camera and sound at the faculty Film and Television.

After all of his studies, he did many small projects like short movies and commercials. Later he started making bigger things like series and movies. His work won many prizes. One of the highlights was in 2000. He got a golden 'Fipa' for best actress in Biarritz (France) Film Fesltival, the Juryprice and Best Scenario at the Film Festival d'Amour in Mons (Belgium), a Bronze 'Rosa Camuna' at the Bergamo Film Festival (Italy), the VFF TV-movie Award for Best International Film at the Munich Film Festival (Germany) and Best Actress, Prix de la Jeunesse and the Grand Prix from Genève at Cinema Tout Ecran (film festival in Geneva). Lately he made a big movie titled De Heineken Ontvoering (also known as The Heineken Kidnapping). Now Maarten is still working. He is engaged to Marnie Blok and has two children: a boy (Milan) and a girl (Tess).

Filmography

References

External links 
  Filmography
 
  about Heineken Kidnapping
  about Heineken Kidnapping

1959 births
Living people
Dutch film directors
Mass media people from Amsterdam
People from Westerveld